Mitsubishi Gas Chemical Company, Inc. (三菱ガス化学, Mitsubishi Gasu Kagaku, MGC) is a Japanese company.

History
The company was established in 1918 and incorporated in 1951.

Divisions
The company operates five business segments, four producing different types of chemical products. These divisions are natural gas-related chemicals, aromatic-related chemicals, functional chemicals, specialty functional materials and a real estate business. As of March 31, 2012, the Company had 91 subsidiaries and 41 associated companies. The company has a Research and Development Organization. The company organization has a research and development department for each plant that contributes to creating newer and better products by enhancing the quality of current products and technologies.

References

External links

Companies listed on the Tokyo Stock Exchange
Mitsubishi companies
Chemical companies of Japan
Japanese companies established in 1918
Manufacturing companies established in 1918